Barenton-sur-Serre (literally Barenton on Serre) is a commune in the department of Aisne in the Hauts-de-France region of northern France.

Geography
Barenton-sur-Serre is located some 35 km southeast of Saint-Quentin and 15 km northeast of Laon.  National Route N2 passes through the commune from Froidmont-Cohartille in the northeast running southwest through the commune.  Access to the village is by road D3060 running west from the N2 to the village then continuing north-west to road D12. There is also access to the village on a country road from Froidmont-Cohartille. There is quite a large area of forest north of the village and in a belt extending southeast of the village. The rest of the commune is all farmland.

The Ru de Barentons flows from the south of the commune into the Souche river which flows from east to west through the commune then continues northwest to join the Serre river.

Neighbouring communes and villages

Administration

List of Successive Mayors of Barenton-sur-Serre

Population

Gallery

See also
Communes of the Aisne department

References

External links
Barenton-sur-Serre on the old National Geographic Institute website 
40000 Bell Towers website 
Barenton-sur-Serre on Géoportail, National Geographic Institute (IGN) website 
Baranton sur Serre on the 1750 Cassini Map

Communes of Aisne